Save Me is a 2007 film directed by Robert Cary about Mark (Chad Allen), a drug-addicted gay man who is admitted into an ex-gay program run by Gayle (Judith Light) and her husband Ted (Stephen Lang). The film premiered at the 2007 Sundance Film Festival and was later picked up for distribution by independent studio First Run Features.

In September 2008 the film began its limited theatrical release in select markets in the United States.

The film screened at over 6 film festivals and drew positive reviews from Entertainment Weekly, Variety, Time Out London and several other publications.

Plot summary
When Mark—a young gay man addicted to sex and drugs—hits bottom, his concerned brother checks him into a Christian retreat in the New Mexico desert. Run by a compassionate husband and wife team, Gayle and Ted have made it their life's mission to "cure" young men of their 'gay affliction' through spiritual guidance. At first, Mark resists, but soon takes the message to heart. As Mark's fellowship with his fellow Ex-Gays grow stronger, however, he finds himself powerfully drawn to Scott, another young man battling family demons of his own. As their friendship begins to develop into romance, Mark and Scott are forced to confront their true selves.

Cast

References

External links
 
 
 

2007 films
American LGBT-related films
Films about conversion therapy
Films about LGBT and Christianity
2007 drama films
Films shot in New Mexico
American drama films
LGBT-related drama films
First Run Features films
2007 LGBT-related films
2000s English-language films
2000s American films